In mathematics, the Morrey–Campanato spaces (named after Charles B. Morrey, Jr. and Sergio Campanato)  are Banach spaces which extend the notion of functions of bounded mean oscillation, describing situations where the oscillation of the function in a ball is proportional to some power of the radius other than the dimension.

The seminorm of the Morrey spaces is given by 

When , the Morrey space is the same as the usual  space. When , the space contains only the 0 function.

The seminorm of the Campanato space is given by

where 
 

When , the Campanato space is the space of functions of bounded mean oscillation. For , the space contains only constant functions.

References

Function spaces